The Dominican Republic competed at the 2022 World Games held in Birmingham, United States from 7 to 17 July 2022.

Competitors
The following is the list of number of competitors in the Games.

Racquetball

The Dominican Republic competed in racquetball.

Water skiing

The Dominican Republic competed in water skiing.

References

Nations at the 2022 World Games
2022
World Games